Suning may refer to:
 Suning.com, a Chinese retailer, originally corner Jiangsu Road and Ninghai Road, co-founded by Zhang Jindong, was known as Suning Appliance Co., Ltd. and Suning Commerce Group Co., Ltd.
 Suning Holdings Group, the fourth largest shareholder of Suning.com, a wholly owned subsidiary of Zhang Jindong, a conglomerate
 Suning Appliance Group, the second largest shareholder of Suning.com, a real estate and holding company whose majority owners include Zhang Jindong
 Jiangsu F.C., a defunct football club once owned by Suning Appliance Group Co., Ltd.
 Suning Real Estate, a Chinese real estate company owned by Zhang Jindong
 Suning Universal, a Chinese real estate company, chaired by the elder brother of the co-founder of Suning.com, Zhang Guiping
 Suning (esports), a Chinese professional esports organization
Suning County, Hebei

See also 
 Suning Plaza (disambiguation)
 Nanjing Olympic Suning Tower
 Su Ning, Chinese army officer
 Suining, city in Sichuan, China
 Sunning (disambiguation)